Esin Afşar (née Sinanoğlu; 1 January 1936 – 14 November 2011) was a well-known Turkish singer and stage actress.

Personal life
She was born in Bari, Italy to Nüzhet Haşim Sinanoğlu, a writer and consular official of Turkey and his wife Rüveyde, a journalist and writer. Esin was the youngest of five siblings. Her brother, Oktay Sinanoğlu, became a notable professor of chemistry. Other brothers became professor of Latin, professor of Ancient Greek and Press Chief at European Council in Strasbourg.

She attended TED Ankara Koleji, and then studied piano at the  Ankara State Conservatory.  After graduation, she entered Turkish State Opera and Ballet as a pianist. But then her focus shifted to the stage. In 1958 she married Kerim Afşar, another stage artist. After 12 years of stage she returned to music and began singing in French and Italian. But after collaborating with Ruhi Su, she included Turkish folk music (türkü) to her repertoire. After she got a divorce from Kerim Afşar, she married Şener Aral in 1975. After the mid-1980s, she was mainly active in foreign tours. She also played parts in drama. In 1999, she was hospitalized and her recovery was slow.

Although she briefly returned to concerts and album recordings, Afşar died on 14 November 2011 in a hospital in Istanbul, where she was taken due to leukemia about three weeks earlier. She was laid to rest at the Karacaahmet Cemetery. She was survived by her husband Şener Aral, son Doğan Can and daughter Pınar.

Career
Although her repertoire included a wide collection of various melodies of different tastes, her fame mainly stems from Turkish folklore. In 1969 two of her arranged folklore melodies became hits. These were Bana seni gerek (lyrics by Yunus Emre (1240-1321) and composition by Esin Afşar herself) and Yoh Yoh (by contemporary folklore poet Kul Ahmet). The melody on the reverse side of the Yoh Yoh 45rpm, was Bebek, a well known anonymous Turkmen folklore melody. After the release of Yoh Yoh she was nicknamed "Bayan Yoh Yoh" ("Mrs. Yoh Yoh").

She was sent to Hungary by İhsan Sabri Çağlayangil, the minister of Foreign Affairs as an official representative of Turkish culture. In 1970, she gave a series of concerts in Italy. In 1972, she visited Soviet Union (especially those republics which would soon be called Turkic Republics) and South Korea. In 1973, she was in Israel, Great Britain, Belgium and Tunis and in 1974 in Australia. She also participated in the Turkish under contest to nominate a Turkish participant for the Eurovision Song Contest 1975. In 1980, in a live TV program, she sang a melody with lyrics from Nazım Hikmet and her melodies were banned by the military junta. In 1985, she gave a concert in Paris. In 1988, she appeared in  concerts at Lausanne, Switzerland, and the next year, in 1989 at Mulhouse, France.

Esin Afşar and Arabesque
Esin Afşar was strictly against a new style of music in Turkey emerged after the 1970s, named Arabesque, which was similar to Arabic music with Turkish lyrics. She protested Arabesque by composing a melody "Arabeske İnat" ("In Spite of Arabesque").

Discography

Albums 
 Dün ve Bugünün Türk Şiir ve Ezgileri, 1986 (poems)
 Ruhi Su'ya Türkü, 1987
 Yunus Emre, 1991
 Esin Alaturka, 1995
 Atatürk, 1997
 Özlem, 1998
 Pembe Uçurtma, 1998
 Caz Yorumlarıyla Aşık Veysel, 1999
 Nazım Hikmet Şarkıları, 2000
 Yunus Emre & Mevlana Şarkıları, 2002
 Söz Çiğdem Talu, 2006
 Büyük Türk Şairi Nazım Hihmet, 2010
 Esin Afşar Odeon Yılları, 2010

45 rpm singles
 Allam Allam Seni Yar / Yoh Yoh, 1970
 Niksarın Fidanları / Aliyi Gördüm Aliyi, 1970
 Gurbet Yorganı / Elif, 1970
 Halalay Çocuk / Güzelliğin On Para Etmez, 1970
 Allam Allam Seni Yar / Drama Köprüsü, 1970
 Yoh Yoh / Bebek (Bir Masal Türküsü), 1970
 Kara Toprak / Yunus (Bana Seni gerek Seni), 1970
 Yağan Yağmur / Çatladı Dudaklarım Öpülmeyi Öpülmeyi, 1971
 Diley Diley Yar / Yaprağı, 1971
 Sivastopol / Küçük Kuşum, 1971
 Gel Dosta Gidelim / Sorma, 1971
 Dert Şarkısı / Niye Çattın Kaşlarını, 1974
 Sandığımı Açamadım / Güneşe Giden Gemi, 1974
 Canı Sıkılan Adam / Yiğidin Öyküsü, 1975
 Sanatçının Kaderi / O Pencere, 1975
 Hacer Hanım / Ben Olayım, 1976
 Zühtü / Kaz, 1976

References

External links
 

1936 births
2011 deaths
Turkish women singers
Turkish stage actresses
People from Bari
TED Ankara College Foundation Schools alumni
Ankara State Conservatory alumni
Turkish folk musicians
Burials at Karacaahmet Cemetery
Deaths from leukemia
Deaths from cancer in Turkey